Shree Venkatesh Films is an Indian film production and distribution company established in 1995 and founded by Shrikant Mohta and Mahendra Soni. This entertainment media company has produced and distributed movies in Eastern India  in Bengali, Hindi and English.

2021-present

2016–2020

2011–2015

2006–2010

2001–2005

1996–2000

See also
 Cinema of West Bengal
 List of film production companies in India
 Surinder Films

References

Shree Venkatesh Films
Shree Venkatesh Films